Tourism in India is economically important and ever growing. The World Travel & Tourism Council calculated that tourism generated  or 9.6% of the nation's GDP in 2016 and supported 40.343 million jobs, 9.3% of its total employment. Various states and union territories of India attract tourists from all over the world, mainly due to the cultural diversity.

Andaman and Nicobar Island

Tourism is the major revenue generating industry in Andaman and Nicobar Islands. According to official estimates, the flow of tourists in the Andamans more than tripled in 2016–17 to 430,000 from 130,000 in 2008–09. 
 Andaman and Nicobar Islands is an archipelago of over 570 tropical islands, of which only 36 are inhabited.
 Radhanagar beach at Havelock Island was bestowed with the title of ‘Asia’s Best Beach’ in 2004 by TIME magazine. It is also listed as world's 7th most spectacular beach in the world on Times list. 
 Barren Island which is about 135 km (84 mi) north-east of the territory's capital, Port Blair, is the only confirmed active volcano in South Asia. 
 Historic Cellular Jail in Port Blair was used by the British to exile political prisoners during the struggle for India's independence to the remote archipelago. Presently, the jail complex serves as a national memorial monument.

Andhra Pradesh

A study in 2014 published by The Economic Times said that undivided Andhra Pradesh had emerged as the "most-preferred" tourist destination for domestic travellers with about 20 per cent share in the total domestic tourist visits across India in 2012.

Andhra Pradesh is the home of many religious pilgrim centres:
 Tirumala Tirupati, the abode of Lord Venkateswara, is the second richest and most visited religious centre (of any faith) in the world. This temple is also one among the 108divyadesam dedicated to Lord Vishnu. Brahmotsavam (Brahma's Utsavam) is a nine day long festival held every year in the month of October and as many as 5,00,000 devotees will throng to the hill for seeking blessings of the lord.
Kanaka Durga Temple of goddess Durga is situated on the Indrakeeladri hill in the city of Vijayawada on the banks of Krishna River. A large number of pilgrims attend the colourful celebrations of Tepotsavam and for holy dip in the Krishna river during the festival of Dusshera.
Mallikarjuna Temple, Srisailam temple situated at Srisailam in the Nallamala Hills of Kurnool district, is the abode of lord Shiva and is one of the twelve Jyotirlinga shrines in India. Lord Rama himself installed the Sahasralinga, while the Pandavas lodged the Panchapandava lingas in the temple courtyard.
The Kodandarama temple, Vontimitta, Kadapa district is a 16th-century temple dedicated to Lord Sri Rama is of great significance in the history of Andhra Pradesh.
The five ancient Hindu temples of Lord Shiva, known as Pancharama Kshetras, are located atAmararama (Amaravathi), Draksharama, Somarama (Bhimavaram), Ksheerarama (Palakollu) and Kumararama (Samalkota).
Srikalahasteeswara temple located on the banks of the river Swarnamukhi, Srikalahasti, Chittoor district is one among the panchabhoota lingas which represents Vaayu, henceforth the Linga is also called Vaayu linga. The rest four lingas are present in Tamil Nadu.
 There are nine temples dedicated to Lord Narasimha. Eight temples are located in Andhra Pradesh, they are Simhachalam, Antarvedi, Vedadri, Mangalagiri, Penchalakona, Ahobilam, Yaganti and Kadiri. Ahobilam is one among the 108divyadesams dedicated to Lord Vishnu and Mangalagiri is one of the eight swayambhu kshetras of lord Vishnu. The other one is Yadagirigutta, also known as Yadadri of Telangana state.
As per the astadasha shakti peetha sloka, three shakti peethas are situated in Andhra Pradesh state. They are Draksharamam (originally known as Daksharamam), Pithapuram and Srisailam.
The lord Veerabhadra swamy temple, right in the middle of Godavari river near to Pattiseema village is a famous temple referred in puranas. Legend says that, Lord Veerabhadra washed his blooded sword after destructing NiShiva yaga held at Draksharamam by king Daksha, father of Uma Devi.
Lord Hanuman temple at Ponnur, Guntur district is a famous temple. The height of Hanuman statue is more than 23 metres and also there is a temple for Garuda right opposite to Hanuman's temple in the same premises.
Ainavilli, located at a distance of 12 km from Amalapuram and Kanipakam, Chittoor district are known for lord Vighneshwara temples.
Trikutaparvatam, well known as Kotappakonda, is a sacred pilgrim place near Narasaraopet of Guntur district. Maha Shivaratri is a festival done here. Approximately 7 - 8 lakhs of devotees throng to the temple for Lord almighty's blessings.
Other religious places include, Raghavendra Swami Mutt in Mantralayam of Kurnool district, Lord Venkateswara temple in Dwaraka Tirumala of West Godavari District, Annavaram temple in East Godavari and Arasavalli Surya temple, srikurmam and Srimukhalingam temples of Srikakulam District etc., are also religious places for divine worships in the state.
For other important temples see List of Hindu temples in Andhra Pradesh.

Buddhist centres:
 AmaravathiGuntur District
 Nagarjuna KondaGuntur District
 BhattiproluGuntur District
 GhantasalaKrishna District
 SankaramVisakhapatnam District
 BavikondaVisakhapatnam District
 ThotlakondaVisakhapatnam District
 RamatheerthamVizianagaram District
 SalihundamSrikakulam District
 LingapalemWest Godavari District
Others are Pavurallakonda, Chandavaram, Guntupalli, Adurru, Kummarilova, Kotturu Dhanadibbalu, Karukonda, kapavaram, Nandalu

Attractions:
 Araku ValleyKnown as Andhra's Ooty near to Vizag City known for its coffee planation.
 Undavalli Caves - A four-storied monolithic cave those were carved out from a hill during 4th century A.D.
 Gandikota Fort - Built on the banks of river Penna comprises Madhavaraya and Ranganatha temples. This area resembles the grand canyon of Arizona state, so also called as grand canyon of India.
 The Hanuman temple at Kanchikacherla village of Krishna district is a tourist destination. The height of the statue is 135 metres. This is located on the Vijayawada - Hyderabad highway.
 Thimmamma MarrimanuThe world's largest banyan tree and "Marrimanu" was recorded as the biggest tree in the Guinness Book of World Records in 1989. Its branches spread over nearly 5 acres (2.1 ha). Located about 35 km from Kadiri, and a 100 km from Anantapur.
 LepakshiIt is the largest monolithic Nandi (a bull, the mount of Shiva) in the world, (length 27 feet, height 15 feet), It is 15 km (9.3 mi) east of Hindupur, and 105 km from Anantapur, and about 120 km (75 mi) north of Bangalore. The temple has a hanging pillar which shows the greatest piece of work by Vijayanagara empire.
 Prakasam BarrageA bridge which was constructed by the British Government in the remembrance of Tanguturi Prakasam, is the best tourist spot to visit in Vijayawada
 Kolleru LakeA lake situated between Krishna and West Godavari District.
 Pulicat Lake is located at the border of Andhra Pradesh and Tamil Nadu, Pulicat Lake covers an area of 500 km2. It is a brackish water lagoon, the second-largest in India, and is situated along the coast of Bay of Bengal. The lake encompasses the Pulicat Lake Bird Sanctuary which attracts many migratory birds, it also is a feeding & nesting ground for aquatic and terrestrial birds such as flamingos and pelicans.
 Uppalapadu Bird Sanctuary is a reserved Bird sanctuary at Uppalapadu, Guntur district, Andhra Pradesh . It witnesses approximately 8,000 types of birds from the around the world. The birds from different countries migrate to this place mainly during the months of October to January.
 Ethipothala Falls is located in Macherla mandal, Guntur district on the river Chandravanka, also known as Ethipothala river, one of the tributaries of river Krishna. The waterfall is situated at a distance of 11 km from Nagarjuna Sagar.
 The Borra Caves in the Anatagiri Hills of the Eastern Ghats, near Visakhapatnam at an altitude of about 800 to 1300 metres are known for million-year-old stalactite and stalagmite formations. They were discovered by British geologist William King George in 1807. The caves got the name from a formation inside the caves that looks like the human brain, which in Telugu language is known as burra.
 The Belum Caves in Kurnool District have a length of 3,229 metres (10,594 ft), making them the second largest natural caves on the Indian subcontinent. The Belum Caves derive their name from Bilum, the Sanskrit word for caves. The caves have long passages, spacious chambers, freshwater galleries, and siphons. The caves deepest point is 120 feet (37 m) from the entrance and is known as Patalganaga.
 The Indira Gandhi Zoological Park is a zoo situated in the reserved forests of Visakhapatnam.
 Sri Venkateswara National Park situated at the reserved forests of Tirumala hills, Chittoor district. This area comprises many waterfalls such as Talakona, Gundalakona and Gunjana.
 Horsely hills  is a group of mountains of ecological importance situated in Madanapalle of Chittoor district.
 Suryalanka beach  is a resort developed by APTDC situated at a distance of 8 km from Bapatla, Guntur district.
 Rajahmundry often referred to as cultural capital of Andhra Pradesh, is the hub for Engineering and Architectural monuments such as Godavari Bridge (World's second-largest Road cum Railway Bridge), Iskon Temple, Tantikonda, Sir Arthur Cotton Museum, Pushkar Ghat, Gowthami Ghat. A festival called Pushkaram is celebrated along the Godavari river for every 12 years and Rajahmundry attracts 4–5 crore people during the tenure of the festival.
 The golden beaches at Visakhapatnam and the city is home to many tourist attractions such as the INS Karasura Submarine museum, Yarada Beach, VUDA Park. The weather in Andhra Pradesh is mostly tropical and the best time to visit is in November through to January. The monsoon season commences in June and ends in September, so travel would not be advisable during this period.

Arunachal Pradesh

Arunachal Pradesh finds mention in the literature of Kalika Purana and Mahabharata. This place is supposed to be the Prabhu Mountains of the Puranas. It was here that sage Parashuram washed away his sin, sage Vyasa meditated, King Bhishmaka founded his kingdom and Lord Krishna married his consort Rukmini. The widely scattered archaeological remains at different places in Arunachal bears testimony to its rich cultural heritage.

There are places of worship and pilgrimage such as the Parasuramkund and the 400‑year‑old Tawang Monastery, or the sites of archaeological excavations like Malinithan and Itanagar, the natural environment of lakes such as Ganga lake or Sela lake or the numerous variations of the snow-clad silver mountain peaks and green meadows where thousands of species of flora and fauna prosper. In addition, the state provides abundant scope for angling, boating, rafting, trekking and hiking. Besides, there are a number of wild life sanctuaries and national parks with rare animals, birds and plants.

The climate varies from hot and humid to heavy rainfall in the Shivalik range. It becomes progressively cold as one moves northwards to higher altitudes. Trees of great size, plentiful climbers and abundance of cane and bamboo make Arunachal evergreen.
Arunachal Pradesh is home to more than six hundred species of orchids, occurring in varying elevations and climatic conditions throughout the state.

Assam

Assam is the central state in the North-East Region of India and serves as the gateway to the rest of the Seven Sister States. Assam has a number of wildlife preserves – the Kaziranga National Park, which is home to the great Indian one-horned rhinoceros, the Manas National Park, Dibru-Saikhowa National Park, Nameri National Park and Pobitora Wildlife Sanctuary (These first two parks are UNESCO World Heritage Site); the largest river island Majuli, known for its Vaishnavite Sattras; historic Sivasagar, known for the ancient monuments of Ahom Kingdom; the city of eternal romance, Tezpur and the scenic tea-estates dating back to time of British Raj. The weather is mostly sub-tropical. Assam experiences the Indian monsoon and has one of the highest forest densities in India. The winter months (Mid October to first half of April) are the best time to visit. The heritage of Madan Kamdev is same as Khajuraho which is located just 30 km away from Guwahati. Along with the Madan Kamdev tourist can visit a very ancient temple Gopeswar Mandir situated in a village Deuduar near to Guwahati. Basudev Than is a more than 300-year-old Satra in Assam.

Assam has a rich cultural heritage going back to the Ahom Kingdom, which governed the region for many centuries before the British occupation. Other notable features include the Brahmaputra River, the mystery of the bird suicides in Jatinga, numerous temples including Kamakhya Temple of Tantric sect. 'Gurdwara Sri Guru Tegh Bahadur also known as Damdama Sahib at Dhubri'This Gurudwara is situated in the heart of the Dhubri Town on the bank of the mighty Brahmaputra river in far north-east India. Guru Teg Bahadur the holy Sikh Guru visited this place in 1505 and met Srimanta Sankardeva (the founder of the Mahapuruxiya Dharma) as the Guru travelled from Dhaka to Assam, ruins of palaces, etc. Guwahati, the capital city of Assam, boasts many bazaars, temples, and wildlife sanctuaries. The government is taking many initiatives to promote tourism in Assam.

Bihar

Bihar is one of the oldest continuously inhabited places in the world with history of 3000 years. The rich culture and heritage of Bihar is evident from the innumerable ancient monuments that are dotted all over this state in eastern India. This is the place of Mahavira, the 24th and last Tirthankara, Aryabhata, Great Ashoka, Chanakya, Gautama Buddha, Mahavira, Guru Gobind Singh, Chandragupta Maurya, Vātsyāyana, Sher Shah Suri, Maa Tara Chandi Temple, and many other great historical figures.

On an average, 20 million domestic tourists and 1 million foreign tourists visit Bihar annually.

Attractions:
 PatnaThe capital of Bihar, known for its rich history and royal architecture
 GayaKnown for Bodh Gaya the place at which Gautama Buddha attained enlightenment
 MuzaffarpurKnown for its education Garibnath Mandir, Sikandarpur mann, Devi Mandir, Banglamukhi Mandir, Jai Mata Di Mandir, Jubba Sahani park 
 DarbhangaIt is among the oldest cities of Bihar. Famous for the Maharaja forts and Kali Mandir.
 NalandaLocation of one of the world's oldest university
 KesariyaLocation of the world's largest Buddhist Stupa
 SasaramTomb of Sher Shah Suri, the great emperor of medieval India
 Sonepur Cattle FairThe Sonepur cattle fair or Sonepur Mela, it is the biggest cattle fair of Asia and stretches on from fifteen days to one month
 Takht Sri Patna SahibA Sikh pilgrimage known as the birthplace of Sikh's Tenth Guru Sri Guru Gobind Singh Sahib
 MungerHome to the only Yoga University in the world, Bihar School of Yoga. Religious places such as Shakti Peethas.
 DeogharA Hindu pilgrimage known for the Satsang Ashram of Sri Sri Thakur Anukul Chandra situated at Satsang Nagar
 VaishaliLord Mahavir was born on the outskirts of this ancient city, and lived in Vaishali until he was 22
 Champapuri - It is one of the most sacred places of Jainism. Lord Vasupujya, the 12th Jain Tirthankara was born in Champapuri and it is the place where all the five  of Lord Vasupujya took place. Location of 31 feet monolithic statue, the tallest statue of Lord Vasupujya. Sitamarhi: It is a native place of Devi Sita Mata.
 Rajgir - It is sacred to Buddhism and Jainism. The place has temples belonging to Jainism, Buddhism and Hinduism. The ancient site also has Son Bhandar Caves.
 Pawapuri - Mahavira, the last of the twenty-four Tirthankara attained Nirvana or moksha (liberation). He was cremated at Pawapuri. There was a great rush to collect his ashes, with the result that so much soil was removed from the place of his cremation that a pond was created.

Chandigarh

Chandigarh is a city located on the foothills of Himalayas and is the capital of two statesPunjab and Haryana. Chandigarh is also called "City Beautiful" with various tourist attractions such as Nek Chand Rock Garden, Zakir Hussain Rose Garden, Sukhna lake, and Open Hand Monument. This place was recorded as the Cleanest city of India by Ministry of Urban Development, Government of India. A majestic view of the Shivalik Hills including Kasauli is visible from here. Chandigarh is a well planned city and is also one of the earliest planned cities.

Chhattisgarh

Chhattisgarh is a new state but with an ancient civilisation, which can be felt by visiting the historical remains in the state. The state is blessed by nature with magnificent water falls, mountains, forests and wildlife. The Green State of Chhattisgarh has 41.33% of its area under forests and is one of the richest bio-diversity areas in the country. There are many tourist attractions worth seeing. It is India's tenth-largest state and situated in the heart of India, is endowed with a rich cultural heritage and attractive natural diversity. The state has many ancient monuments, rare wildlife, exquisitely carved temples, Buddhist sites, palaces, water falls, caves, rock paintings and hill plateaus. Most of these sites are untouched and unexplored and offer a unique and alternate experience to tourists, compared to traditional destinations which have become overcrowded.

Main attractions of Chhattisgarh are Chitrakot Waterfalls, Kutumsar Caves, Ramgarh and Sita Bengra, Bhoramdeo temple, Arang temples, Sirpur, Rajim, Ratanpur and Malhar. Kakotal is also famous for its waterfall.

Delhi

Delhi is the capital union territory of India. A fine blend of old and new, ancient and modern, the new gen Delhi is almost very popular among the other states.  It is a metropolitan city comprising more than 10% of India's population. There are many sources available in Delhi which made kings in ancient times to capitalise this state, Delhi is a melting pot of cultures and religions. Old Delhi has been the capital of numerous empires that ruled India, making it rich in history. New Delhi, on the other hand, is a modern city designed by Edwin Lutyens and Herbert Baker. The various rulers left behind their trademark architectural styles. Delhi currently has many renowned historic monuments and landmarks such as the Tughlaqabad fort, Qutub Minar, Purana Quila, Lodhi Gardens, Jama Masjid, Humayun's tomb, Red Fort, and Safdarjung's Tomb. Modern monuments include Jantar Mantar, India Gate, Rashtrapati Bhavan, Laxminarayan Temple, Lotus Temple, Lal Mandir and Akshardham Temple.

New Delhi is famous for its British colonial architecture, wide roads, and tree-lined boulevards. Delhi is home to numerous political landmarks, national museums, Islamic shrines, Hindu temples, green parks, and trendy malls.

Goa

Goa is one of the most famous tourist destinations in India. A former colony of Portugal, Goa is famous for its excellent beaches, amazing nightlife, Yogas, spas and massage, flea markets and shopping, water sports activities like cruising, Portuguese churches, Hindu temples, and wildlife sanctuaries. The Basilica of Bom Jesus, Basilica of Se Cathedral, Mangueshi Temple, Dudhsagar Falls, Shantadurga, Anjuna Beach, Aguada Fort, and Chapora Fort are famous attractions in Goa. Recently a Wax Museum (Wax World) has also opened in Old Goa housing a number of wax personalities of Indian history, culture and heritage.

The Goa Carnival is a world-famous event, with colourful masks and floats, drums and reverberating music, and dance performances.
Best Beaches In Goa

Gujarat

Gujarat, the seventh largest state in India, located in the western part of India with a coastline of 1600 km (longest in India). It is the tenth most popular state in the country for tourists with annual footfall of 18.9 million tourists. Gujarat's natural environment varies from the Great Rann of Kutch to the hills of Saputara. Gujarat is the sole home of the pure Asiatic lions and is considered to be one of the most important protected areas in Asia. Ancient Dholavira, archaeological site in Kutch District and Lothal, archaeological site in Ahmedabad district contains ruins of ancient Indus Valley civilization city, ruins of Dholavira is one of the largest Harappan archaeological sites.

During the Sultanate reign, Hindu craftsmanship mix with Islamic architecture, giving rise to the Indo-Saracenic style. Many structures in the state are built in this fashion. It is also the birthplace of Mahatma Gandhi and Sardar Vallabhai Patel, the great iconic figures during India's Independence movement. Gujarat offers business tourism, archaeological and heritage tourism, cultural tourism, religious tourism, wildlife tourism, and medical tourism. Amitabh Bachchan is currently the brand ambassador of Gujarat Tourism. Ahmedabad is considered an ideal hub to cover all the destinations across Gujarat. In the year 2018 the famous Statue of Unity which is 597 ft. tall statue in honour of Vallabhbhai Patel (1875–1950) is also located in Gujarat.

Haryana

The pilgrim places of Haryana are thronged by devotees all over the year, who visit the important religious places to seek divine blessings and eternal happiness.

The state of Haryana has a long historical and cultural tradition which is manifested in the numerous religious places which fills the tourist with an intense sense of satisfaction. Some of the notable "Pilgrim Destinations" of Haryana are:

Kurukshetra- The historical place of "Kurukshetra" is the cradle of Hindu civilisation. The fierce battle field of the holy land of "Kurukhshetra" is a witness to the discourse between the mighty and valiant ruler "Arjuna" and his divine charioteer "Lord Krishna".

Jyotisar- The ancient place of "Jyotisar" is the nurturing ground of the values and principles that guide the oldest religion of the world, the "Hindu" religion. The significance of the place lies in the fact that the holy religious text of the "Hindus", the "Bhagwad Gita" was compiled in this sacred place

Thanesar- The sacred place of "Thanesar" has two important religious temples of the "Sthanesvar Mahadev Temple" and the "Ma Bhadra Kali Temple" that draws several devotees throughout the year

Pehowa- The holy land of "Pehowa" is an important religious place among the Hindus, who pray to the deceased member of their family and offer "Pind Daan" to release them from the cycle of birth and rebirth

Khatushyam The holy place from the time of Mahabharata.

Panchkula- Panchkula has numerous places of religious and historical importance, including "Morni hills" and "Tikkar Taal".

Dhosi HillA hill near Narnaul, having Vedic period Rishi, Chaywan's Ashram. Famous for preparation of Chyawanprash, and other herbal preparations.

Pharal- Phalgu Tirth is an Indian pilgrimage site, where pilgrimages are undertaken by the Hindus during the Shraadhs. It is located in Pharal village in the Pundri sub-tehsil of Kaithal district in Haryana state. Pharal village is located between Pundri and Dhand in Kaithal district 24 kilometres (15 mi) away from district headquarter Kaithal and is 34 kilometres (21 mi) to Kurukshetra city

Himachal Pradesh

Himachal Pradesh is famous for its Himalayan landscapes and popular hill-stations. Tourism is the state contributes a major part in its economy and growth. Outdoor activities such as rock climbing, mountain biking, paragliding, ice-skating, and heli-skiing are popular tourist attractions in Himachal Pradesh.

Shimla, the state capital, is very popular hill station among tourists. One can reach Shimla by road, train and by air. The Kalka-Shimla Railway is a narrow gage mountain railway which is a UNESCO World Heritage Site. Other popular hill stations include Manali, Dalhousie and Kasauli.

Dharamshala, home of the Dalai Lama, is known for its Tibetan monasteries and Buddhist temples. Many trekking expeditions also begin here. It is located in the Kangra valley at the foot of the Dhauladhar mountains.
Manali is famous for skiing, snowboarding and other adventure sports such as white water rafting. Bir is known for paragliding. The Spiti valley is well known for its unique landscapes and culture.

Jammu and Kashmir

KASHMIR is noted for its scenic landscape, ancient temples and mosques, Hindu and Muslim shrines, castles, gardens and forts. The Hindu holy shrines of Amarnath in Kashmir Valley attracts about .4 million Hindu devotees every year. Vaishno Devi also attract millions of Hindu devotees every year. Jammu's historic monuments feature a unique blend of Islamic and Hindu architecture styles.

Tourism forms an integral part of the Kashmiri economy. Often dubbed "Paradise on Earth", Kashmir's mountainous landscape has attracted tourists for centuries. Notable places are Dal Lake, Srinagar Pahalgam, Gulmarg, Yeusmarg, Mughal Gardens, etc. Kashmir's natural landscape has made it one of the popular destinations for adventure tourism in South Asia.

Jharkhand

Jharkhand is the eastern state of India formed in 2000. It is known for its forest cover and mine reserves. One of the biggest tourist attraction in Jharkhand is Vaidyanath jyotirlinga situated in Deoghar district.

Shikharji located on Parasnath hill, the highest mountain in the state of Jharkhand, is the most important Jain Tirtha (pilgrimage site), believed to be the place where twenty of the twenty-four Jain tirthankaras along with many other monks attained Moksha.

Baidyanath Temple at Deoghar, is one of the twelve Jyotirlingas, the most sacred abodes of Shiva, during month of Shraavana, Shravani Mela is an important festival here.

Densely covered in forest, the state has many wildlife sanctuaries including Topchanchi wildlife sanctuary and Palamu wildlife sanctuary.

Karnataka

Karnataka has been ranked as fourth most popular destination for tourism among states of India. It has the highest number of national protected monuments in India, at 507.

Kannada dynasties like Kadambas, Western Gangas, Chalukyas, Rashtrakutas, Hoysalas, Vijayanagaras and the Kingdom of Mysore ruled from what is today Karnataka. They built great monuments to Buddhism, Jainism and Hinduism. These monuments are preserved at Badami, Aihole, Pattadakal, Mahakuta, Hampi, Lakshmeshwar, Sudi, Hooli, Mahadeva Temple (Itagi), Dambal, Lakkundi, Gadag, Hangal, Halasi, Galaganatha, Chaudayyadanapura, Banavasi, Belur, Halebidu, Sringeri, Shravanabelagola, Sannati, Nanjangud, Mysore, Nandi Hills, Kolar, Mudabidri, Gokarna, Bagali, Kuruvatti and many more. Notable Islamic monuments are present at Bijapur, Bidar, Gulbarga, Raichur and other part of the state. Gol Gumbaz at Bijapur, has the second largest pre-modern dome in the world after the Byzantine Hagia Sophia. Karnataka has two World Heritage Sites, at Hampi and Pattadakal. Bellary one of the historical place, we can see the forts which were built by Tipu Sultan for protection.

Karnataka state has several palaces such as Bangalore Palace, Mysore Palace (also known as Ambavilas Palace), Tipu Sultan's Summer Palace, Nalknad Palace, Rajendra Vilas, Jaganmohan Palace, Jayalakshmi Vilas Mansion, Lalitha Mahal, Rajendra Vilas, Cheluvamba Mansion, Shivappa Nayaka Palace and Daria Daulat Bagh.
Karnataka is famous for Jog falls of Shimoga District, the second-highest waterfalls in Asia. Karnataka has many beaches at Malpe, Kaup, Marvanthe, Karwar, Gokarna, Murdeshwara, Surathkal. Karnataka is a rock climbers paradise. Yana in Uttara Kannada, Fort in Chitradurga, Ramnagara near Bengaluru district, Shivagange in Tumkur district and tekal in Kolar district are a rock climbers heaven. Utsav Rock Garden in Shiggaon, Uttar Kannada.

Hill stations in Karnataka are generally unexplored and more pristine than better known ones in South India. Major hill stations in the state are Agumbe and Kodachadri in Shimoga District; Baba Budangiri, Kemmangundi, Kudremukh in Chikkamagaluru District; Biligiriranga Hills in Chamarajanagar District and Kodagu district (also known as Coorg). Other hilly town and regions are Mullayanagiri, Pushpagiri (or Kumara Parvatha), Nandi Hills, Chikkaballapur district, Kundadri, Tadiandamol, Talakaveri, Male Mahadeshwara Hills, Himavad Gopalaswamy Betta, Ambaragudda, Antara Gange, Savandurga, Kurinja, Yedakumeri, Siddara Betta, Bananthimari Betta, Skandagiri, Devarayanadurga and Madhugiri.

Wildlife sanctuaries, national parks and tiger reserves: Karnataka is the state which has the highest population of tigers and elephants in India. It is also the state which has the third highest leopard population in India therefore Karnataka's wildlife makes it the premier wildlife state of India.  Karnataka has several wildlife sanctuaries and national parks such as, Bandipur Tiger Reserve, Nagarhole Tiger Reserve, Bhadra Tiger Reserve, Anshi-Dandeli Tiger Reserve, BRT Tiger Reserve Dandeli Wildlife Sanctuary, Dandeli; Ghataprabha Bird Sanctuary; Daroji Sloth Bear Sanctuary; Peacock sanctuary in Bankapura; Ranebennur blackbuck sanctuary, Haveri district; Deva Raya Wildlife Sanctuary, near Hampi; Attiveri Bird Sanctuary, near Hubli-Dharwad, Uttara Kannada; Anshi National Park, Uttara Kannada; Magadi Bird Sanctuary, Shirahatti; Bhimgad Wildlife Sanctuary; Adichunchanagiri Wildlife Sanctuary; Arabithittu Wildlife Sanctuary ; Biligiriranga Swamy Temple Wildlife Sanctuary; Bhadra Wildlife Sanctuary; Brahmagiri Wildlife Sanctuary; Cauvery Wildlife Sanctuary; Melukote Temple Wildlife Sanctuary ; in Mandya district; Mookambika Wildlife Sanctuary; Nugu Wildlife Sanctuary; Pushpagiri Wildlife Sanctuary; Sharavathi Valley Wildlife Sanctuary; Shettihalli Wildlife Sanctuary; Someshwara Wildlife Sanctuary; Talakaveri Wildlife Sanctuary; Gudavi Bird Sanctuary; Mandagadde Bird Sanctuary; Kaggaladu Heronry; Kokkare Bellur; Bankapura Peacock Sanctuary  and Bonal Bird Sanctuary

Kerala

Kerala is a state on the tropical Malabar Coast of south-western India. Nicknamed as one of the "10 paradises of the world" by National Geographic, Kerala is famous especially for its Eco-tourism initiatives. Its unique culture and traditions, coupled with its varied demography, have made it one of the most popular tourist destinations in India. Growing at a rate of 13.31%, the tourism industry significantly contributes to the state's economy. Kerala is known for its tropical backwaters and pristine beaches in Trivandrum such as Kovalam and Varkala. However, the western part of Idukki district, including Thodupuzha do not receive many visitors from other states.

From the green scapes of Idukki to the buzzing cities like Trivandrum and Kochi, Kerala has its vivid collection of tourist spots. Popular attractions in the state include the beaches at Kovalam, Kappad, Muzhappilangad, Cherai and Varkala; the hill stations of Munnar, Thekkady, Ramakkalmedu Nelliampathi, Ponmudi and Wayanad; forts like the Bekal Fort in Kanhangad and  St. Angelo's Fort in Kannur and the National Parks/ Wildlife sanctuaries at Periyar and Eravikulam. The "backwaters" region—an extensive network of interlocking rivers, lakes, and canals that centre on Alleppey, Kumarakom, and Punnamada also see heavy tourist traffic. Heritage sites, such as East Fort, Kuthira Malika, Hill Palace, Mattancherry Palace are also famous. Cities such as Trivandrum, Cochin, Trichur, Calicut and Quilon are popular centres for shopping and traditional theatrical performance.

The Grand Kerala Shopping Festival (GKSF) claimed to be Asia's largest shopping festival and began in 2007. Since then it has been conducted in December and January. During this period stores and shops registered under the GKSF offer a wide range of discounts, vat refunds etc. Along with the guaranteed shopping experience, shoppers are provided with gift coupons for a fixed value of purchase entering them into weekly and mega lucky draws. As compared to shopping festivals being held in other countries, this Festival converts the entire state of Kerala into a giant shopping mall, and includes both large and small businesses.

The state's tourism agenda promotes ecologically sustained tourism, which focuses on the local culture, wilderness adventures, volunteering and personal growth of the local population. Efforts are taken to minimise the adverse effects of traditional tourism on the natural environment, and enhance the cultural integrity of local people.

Madhya Pradesh

Madhya Pradesh is called the "Heart of India" because of its location in the centre of the country. It has been home to the cultural heritage of Hinduism, Islam, Buddhism, Sikhism and Jainism. Innumerable monuments, exquisitely carved temples, stupas, forts and palaces are dotted all over the state.

The temples of Khajuraho are world-famous for their aphrodisiac sculptures, and are a UNESCO World Heritage Site. Gwalior is famous for its fort, Jai Vilas Palace, the Tomb of Rani Lakshmibai, Md. Ghaus and Tansen.

Famous national parks like Kanha National Park, Bandhavgadh, Madhav National Park, Shivpuri, Pench are located in Madhya Pradesh. Kuno Palpur national park is getting African cheetahs and is expected to become only reserve having four species of big cats (lion, tiger, leopard and cheetah). Spectacular mountain ranges, meandering rivers and miles and miles of dense forests offering a unique and exciting panorama of wildlife in sylvan surroundings.
Madhya pradesh is very much known for Narmada river, is the oldest known holiest and worshiped as a river goddess in Hindu religion. Narmada originates from Amarkantak, a wild reserve and pilgrimage centre for Hindus.
Another great tourist destination is Bhedaghat Falls in Jabalpur. The river Narmada takes the form of massive falls here. The place is surrounded by marble of various colours. The sight is a visual treat in itself. The prime attraction includes boating in the river with amusing commentary by the rower.

Attractions include

♦WildlifeKanha National Park, Bandhavgarh National Park(website), Pench Tiger Reserve

♦HeritageKhajuraho Temple Group, Orchha, Bhimbetka Rock Shelters Caves

♦WorshipUjjain, Omkareshwar, Maheshwar, Maihar, Sanchi

♦Water Bodies / Lakes/ Dams Bhojtal "Upper Lake- Bhopal", Gandhi Sagar Dam, Indirasagar Dam, Pipliyapala, Tawa Reservoir, Bhedaghat

Maharashtra

Maharashtra is one of the most visited states in India by foreign tourists, with over 4.3 million foreign tourist arrivals in 2014. Maharashtra boasts of a large number of popular and revered religious venues that are heavily frequented by locals as well as out-of-state visitors.
Aurangabad is the tourism capital of Maharashtra.

Ajanta Caves, Ellora Caves, Elephanta Caves and Chhatrapati Shivaji Terminus are the four UNESCO World Heritage Sites in Maharashtra and are credited for the development of Tourism in the state.

Mumbai, its capital, is the most popular cosmopolitan city in India, and a great place to experience modern India. Mumbai is famous for Bollywood, the world's largest film industry. In addition, Mumbai is famous for its clubs, shopping, and upscale gastronomy. The city is known for its architecture, from the ancient Elephanta Caves, to the Islamic Haji Ali Mosque, to the colonial architecture of Bombay High Court and Chhatrapati Shivaji Terminus.
Maharashtra also has numerous adventure tourism destinations, including paragliding, rock climbing, canoeing, kayaking, snorkelling, and scuba diving. Maharashtra also has several national parks and reserves, including Tadoba with accommodation and safari experiences besides little known by wildlife destinations like Koyna, Nagzira, Melghat (disturbed with massive mining truck movement), Dajipur, Radhanagari and of course the only national park within metropolis city limits in the world – Sanjay Gandhi National Park. The Bibi Ka Maqbara at Aurangabad, the Mahalakshmi temple at Kolhapur, the cities of Nashik, Trimbak famous for religious importance, the city of Pune the seat of the Maratha Empire and the fantastic Ganesh Chaturthi celebrations together contribute for the Tourism sector of Maharashtra. Mangi Tungi in Nashik is a very important pilgrimage of the Jain community. The 108 ft tall Statue of Ahimsa at Mangi Tungi, the tallest Jain Statue in the world is attracting Jain devotees from around the world. This statue holds the Guinness world record for the tallest Jain idol. Famous temples of Lord Ganesha, Siddhivinayak Temple, Mumbai and Dagadusheth Halwai Ganapati Temple, Pune are located in Maharashtra.

Mahabaleshwar is a hill station in India's forested Western Ghats range, south of Mumbai. It features several elevated viewing points, such as Arthur's Seat. West of here is centuries-old Pratapgad Fort, perched atop a mountain spur. East, Lingmala Waterfall tumbles off a sheer cliff. Colorful boats

Manipur

Manipur as the name suggest is a land of jewels. Its rich culture excels in every aspects as in martial arts, dance, theatre and sculpture. The charm of the place is the greenery with the moderate climate making it a tourists' heaven. The seasonal Shirui lily at Ukhrul district, sangai (brow antlered deer) and the floating islands at Loktak Lake are few of the rare things found in Manipur. Polo, which can be called a royal game, also originated from Manipur. Some of the main tourist attractions are:
 Imphal (capital)
 Churachandpur
 Keibul Lamjao National Park
 War cemeteries
 Loktak Lake
 Moreh

Meghalaya

Meghalaya, translates to the 'home of clouds', where 'megh' means 'clouds' and 'alaya' means 'home'. Meghalaya has some of the thickest surviving forests in the country. Therefore, constitutes one of the most important ecotourism circuits in the country today. The Meghalayan subtropical forests support a vast variety of flora and fauna. Meghalaya has two national parks and three wildlife sanctuaries.

Meghalaya, also offers many adventure tourism opportunities in the form of mountaineering, rock climbing, trekking and hiking, water sports etc. The state offers several trekking routes some of which also afford an opportunity to encounter some rare animals such as the slow loris, assorted deer and bear. The Umiam Lake has a water sports complex with facilities such as rowboats, paddleboats, sailing boats, cruise-boats, water-scooters and speedboats.

Cherrapunjee is one of the most popular tourist spots in North East of India. It lies to the south of the capital Shillong. The town is very well known and needs little publicity. A rather scenic, 50 kilometre long road, connects Cherrapunjee with Shillong.

The popular waterfalls in the state are the Elephant Falls, Shadthum Falls, Weinia falls, Bishop Falls, Nohkalikai Falls, Langshiang Falls and Sweet Falls. The hot springs at Jakrem near Mawsynram are believed to have curative and medicinal properties.
It is a very good place to visit.

Balpakram National Park also known as 'Land of Spirits' by the Garos is located in South Garo Hills district, Baghmara. It has an amazing landscape and it is often compared to Grand Canyon of USA.

Siju Cave is also famous destination in south Garo Hills region. It is 25 km long surveyed by P. Chopra et al. way back in 20th century.

Nokrek National Park is one of the famous places in Garo Hills region. It is home to mother citrus fruit known locally as 'Me•mang Narang' scientifically named Citrus indica.

Mizoram

Mizoram has a dramatic landscape and pleasant climate. The state is rich in bird diversity, which has the potential to make it a major birdwatching destination. Mizoram is a stronghold for Mrs. Hume's pheasant (Syrmaticus humiae). There is also a rare record of the wild water buffalo from the state. There have been several records of sightings of the Sumatran rhinoceros from Mizoram, and Lushai hills. A small population of wild elephants can be seen in Ngengpui and Dampa Sanctuaries. Other interesting sites are Mizo Poets' Square also known as Mizo Hlakungpui Mual in Mizo and the Great Megaliths locally known as 'Kawtchhuah Ropui'.

Odisha

Odisha has been a preferred destination from ancient days for people who have an interest in spirituality, religion, culture, art and the natural environment. Ancient and medieval architecture, pristine sea beaches, the classical dance Odissi and ethnic dance forms like Chhau, Ghumura and Sambalpuri and a variety of festivals. Odisha also has a very rich variety of food. Odisha has kept the religion of Buddhism alive. Research suggests about evidences of Gautama Buddha's birth in Odisha. Rock-edicts that have challenged time stand huge and over-powering by the banks of the Daya River. The torch of Buddhism is still ablaze in the sublime triangle at Udayagiri, Lalitgiri as well as Ratnagiri, on the banks of river Birupa. Precious fragments of a glorious past come alive in the shape of stupas, rock-cut caves, rock-edicts, excavated monasteries, viharas, chaityas and sacred relics in caskets and the Rock-edicts of Ashoka.

Odisha is famous for the world-famous Jagannath Temple (Puri), UNESCO World Heritage Site Konark Sun Temple and The Leaning Temple of Huma. Out of total 4 Chausathi Yogini temples all over India, 2 are in Odisha, in Hirapur and Ranipur Jharial. Famous Oriya Sanskrit Poet Jayadeva, who wrote famous Gita Govinda, a poem of divine love between Lord Krishna and Radha with other Gopis, dedicated to Lord Jagannatha, was born here in Kenduli Sasan village near Khurda.

Rajarani Temple (name derived from the sandstone in which it is made), is an architectural marvel like Khajuraho located in Bhubaneswar (The Temple City of India), containing more than 500 ancient temples. Lord Lingaraja Temple (a 12th-century AD temple), Kedaragauri Temple, Ananta Vasudeva Temple, Brahmeswara Temple are some of the many magnificent Temples in the capital. Bhubaneswar has State Museum, Regional Museum of Natural History (having one of the two eggs of an extinct species in the world), Botanical Garden, Jain centres like Udayagiri and Khandagiri Caves, Pathani Samanta Planetarium, Dhauli White Pagoda where Chandashoka became Dharmashoka.

Odisha is the home for various tribal communities who have contributed uniquely to the multicultural and multilingual character of the state. Their handicrafts, different dance forms, jungle products and their unique life style blended with their healing practices have got worldwide attention. The well-known Ratha-Yatra of Lord Jagannath in Puri and Sitalsasthi Carnival of Lord Shiva in Sambalpur are among the leading sights.

The Indian Revolutionary saying "Give me Blood, I will give you Freedom", Netaji Subhas Chandra Bose was born in Cuttack, whose House (Janakinath Bhavan) is now a museum, well equipped to provide details of his life-history.
The medieval capital, Cuttack has a treasure to share with you, the Barabati fort (witnessing Gangas, Marathas and British), the silver filigree works, Katak Chandi Temple, Barabati Stadium, Qadam-I-Rasul and Dhabaleswar temple (having longest rope-bridge in India succeeded by Lakshman Jhula in Rishikesh).
Eastern Ghats' highest peak, Mahendragiri, where Lord Parshuram is still in meditation, according to Ramayana and Mahabharata is in Gajapati district.

Sites/cities/places of interest:

1. BhubaneswarLingaraj Temple, Rajarani Temple, Dhauligiri, Khandagiri and Udaygiri, Nandankanan Zoological Park.

2. CuttackBarabati Fort, Katak Chandi Temple, Lalitgiri-Ratnagiri-Udaygiri, Dhabaleswar Temple.

3. PuriJagannath Temple, Chilika Lake, Konark Temple and beach.

4. SambalpurSamaleswari Temple, Hirakud Dam.

5. BerhampurGopalpur-on-Sea, Taptapani, Taratarini.

6. Bhitarkanika Sanctuary

7. Mayurbhanj- Shimlipal  Biosphere Reserve

8. DhenkanalKapilas, Saptasajya

9. BalasoreChandipur-on-sea, Chandabali, Chandaneswar, Panchalingeshwar, Aradi (Lord Akhandalamani).

10.Balangir-Harishankar temple, 64 yogini temple

10.Kalahandi- Maa Manikeswari Temple, Bhawanipatna, Phurlijharan Waterfall

Puducherry

The Union Territory of Puducherry comprises four coastal regions viz. Puducherry, Karaikal, Mahe and Yanam. Puducherry is the capital of this Union Territory and one of the most popular tourist destinations in South India. Puducherry has been described by National Geographic as "a glowing highlight of subcontinental sojourn". The city has many colonial buildings, churches, temples, and statues, which, combined with the systematic town planning and the well-planned French-style avenues, still preserve much of the colonial ambiance.

Punjab

The state of Punjab is renowned for its cuisine, culture and history. Punjab has a vast public transportation and communication network. Some of the main cities in Punjab are Amritsar, Jalandhar, Patiala, Pathankot and Ludhiana. Nabha is famous as a manufacturing hub of combine harvesters and other manufacturing units, while Patiala is known for the historical forts. Punjab also has a rich Sikh religious history. Tourism in Punjab is principally suited for the tourists interested in culture, ancient civilisation, spirituality and epic history. Some of the villages in Punjab have traditional Indian homes, farms and temples.
Lonely Planet Bluelist 2008 has voted the Harmandir Sahib as one of the world's best spiritual sites with over 100,000 pilgrims and tourists visiting on a daily basis.

Another main tourist destination is religious and historic city of Sri Anandpur Sahib where many tourists come to see the Virasat-e-Khalsa (Khalsa Heritage Memorial Complex) and also take part in Hola Mohalla festival. Kila Raipur Sports Festival is also popular tourist attraction in Kila Raipur near Ludhiana. Shahpur kandi fort, Ranjit sagar lake and Muktsar Temple also popular attractions in Pathankot.

Rajasthan

Rajasthan, literally meaning "Land of the Kings", is one of the most attractive tourist destinations in Western India. The vast sand dunes of the Thar Desert attract millions of tourists from around the globe every year.

Attractions:
 JaipurThe capital of Rajasthan, famous for its rich history and royal architecture * Pink City
Chittorgarh – Chittorgarh Fort, Vijay Stambh, Kalika Mata Mandir, Kirti Stambh, Rana Kumbha's Palace, Rani Padmini's Palace and temple of renowned devotee of Lord Krishna, Meera (Meera Temple).
 JodhpurFortress-city at the edge of the Thar Desert, famous for its blue homes and architecture and Blue City
 UdaipurKnown as the "Venice" of India *Lake City
 JaisalmerFamous for its golden fortress (one of the largest living fort), its magnificent palaces (Havelis), lake, fossil park, desert sand dune safaris-camps, desert national parks, Jain temples. The city is known as Golden City. 
 AjmerHoly city, popular for shrine of Sufi Saikhllnt Khwaja Moinuddin Chishti
 Barmer – Barmer and surrounding areas offer perfect picture of typical Rajasthani villages
 BikanerFamous for world-famous KARNI Mata Temple (The Rat temple) and medieval history as a trade route outpost 
 Mount AbuIs a popular hill station, the highest peak in the Aravalli Range of Rajasthan, Guru Shikhar is located here. Mount Abu is famous for Dilwara Temples.
 RanakpurLarge Jain Temple complex, with around 1444 pillars and exquisite marble carvings
 PushkarIt has the first and one of the very Brahma temples in the world
 Keoladeo National ParkA UNESCO World Heritage Site
 NathdwaraThis town near Udaipur hosts the famous temple of Shrinathji
 Sawai MadhopurFamous for Ranthambore National Park and historic Ranthambore Fort
 ShekhawatiFor traditional Havelis
 Dhosi HillVedic period Hill, Chyvan Rishi Ashram

Sikkim

Originally known as Suk-Heem, which in the local language means "peaceful home". Sikkim was an independent kingdom until the year 1974, when it became a part of the Republic of India. The capital of Sikkim is Gangtok, located approximately 105 kilometres from New Jalpaiguri, the nearest railway station to Sikkim. Although, Pakyong Airport is under construction in East Sikkim, the nearest airport to Sikkim is Bagdogra Airport. Sightseeing places include Baba Mandir,
Nathula Pass, Rumtek Monastery, Handicraft Shops, Tsangpo Lake, Chardham, Buddha Park, Ridgepark, Flowershows (International Flowershows) Samduptse, Tashi View point Tashiding, Pelling, Yuksom, Rabdentse, Tibrtology, Ropeway and Mt. Kangchenjunga. Sikkim is considered as the land of orchids, mystic cultures and colourful traditions. Sikkim is well known among trekkers and adventure lovers. The treks to Dzongri, Goechala are very popular. To get more details regarding the treks one need to contact a local tour operator registered and recognised by the Department of Tourism, Government of Sikkim. Tsozum Tours, Treks and Expeditions is a local tour operator and handles such treks in Sikkim.

Tamil Nadu

Tamil Nadu was the most visited tourist destination by both Indian and International tourists in 2014 with over 320 million domestic visits and 4.6 million foreign visits. It has places of historical, cultural and architectural significance. Tourism in Tamil Nadu is promoted by Tamil Nadu Tourism Development Corporation by the state government with a logo enchanting Tamil Nadu. TTDC promotes tourism in the state by arranging various functions and events. The capital city of Tamil Nadu -Chennai- is the only place in India to be listed in "52 places to go around the world" by The New York Times. Marina beach in Chennai is the second longest beach in the world and Chennai is home to numerous historic temples and parks. Chennai is also nicknamed as the Gateway of South India.

Temples
The state has three UNESCO World Heritage Sites which include the Great Living Chola Temples and Mahabalipuram. Archaeological sites with civilisation dating back to 3800 years have been discovered in Tamil Nadu. UNESCO World Heritage Sites Mahabalipuram sea shore temples were built by rulers of Pallava dynasty and depicts remarkable art and architecture. The Brihadeeswarar Temple in Thanjavur was built in 1010 A.D. Other major temples include Madurai Meenakshi Amman Temple, Ramanathaswamy Temple, Sri Ranganathaswamy Temple and Arunachaleswara Temple. All these temples showcase Dravidian architecture which prevailed during the ancient period.
The six abodes of Lord Murugan are situated in Tamil Nadu.

Sanctuaries and national parks

The Western Ghats is one of the eight hottest biodiversity hotspots in the world and a UNESCO World Heritage Site. The mangrove forests of Pichavaram are the second largest in the world and the Gulf of Mannar Biosphere Reserve covers an area of 10,500 km2 of ocean, islands and the adjoining coastline including coral reefs, salt marshes, mangroves and is home to endangered aquatic species including dolphins, dugongs, whales and sea cucumbers. The wetlands attract numerous migratory birds from Europe and America. The state government has established 13 bird sanctuaries to protect the birds from poaching and hunting. The state also has various bird sanctuaries including 13 established bird sanctuaries The state is home to one of the largest populations of endangered Indian elephant and Bengal tiger. The region is home to one-third of the tiger population and more than half of the elephant population of India. There are four Project Tiger reserves and four Project Elephant reserves in the state which include Anamalai, Mudumalai, Sathyamangalam and Kalakkad-Mundanthurai. Other threatened and endangered species found in the region include grizzled giant squirrel, grey slender loris, sloth bear, Nilgiri tahr, Nilgiri langur, lion-tailed macaque, and Indian leopard. Kanyakumari is the southernmost tip of mainland India provides scenic view of sunset and sunshine over the Indian Ocean. Water falls like Hogenakkal Falls and wildlife sanctuaries are located across the state.

Hill stations

Ooty, Kodaikanal and Yercaud are well-known hill stations. The Nilgiri Mountain Railway is a mountain railway built in 1908, and operated by a fleet of steam locomotives. In July 2005, UNESCO added the Nilgiri Mountain Railway as an extension to the World Heritage Site Mountain Railways of India.

Medical tourism
The state is a popular destination for medical tourism and the cities of Chennai and Coimbatore house some of Asia's premier hospitals.

Telangana

Telangana, a state with rich historic and cultural heritage is one of the most frequented tourist places in South India. Also known as The City of Pearls, Hyderabad is today one of the most developed cities in the country and a modern hub of information technology, ITES, and biotechnology. Hyderabad is known for its rich history, culture and architecture representing its unique character as a meeting point for North and South India, and also its multilingual culture.

Hyderabad ranked second best place in the world that one should see in 2015 which is published in the annual guide of 'Traveler' magazine of National Geographic.

 Birla Mandir, Hyderabad is a white marble Hindu temple of Lord Venkateshwara on the Naubath Pahad in Hyderabad.
 The Ramappa Temple and Thousand Pillar Temple in Warangal are famous for their temple carvings of the Kakatiya dynasty.
 Sammakka Saralamma Jatara is held every second year in Medaram.
 Gnana Saraswati Temple, Basar (Nirmal district) is a Saraswati temple.
 Sri Rajarajeshwara TempleOne of the famous and most visited Lord Shiva temple located in Vemulawada (Rajanna Sircilla district)
 Vemulavada temple is built by Chalukya Kings between AD 750 and 975.
 Yadagirigutta, the abode of an avatara of Vishnu, Sri Lakshmi Narasimha.

Famous Buddhist centres:
 NelakondapalliKhammam District
 DhulikattaKarimnagar District
 PhanigiriSuryapet District

Pilgrim centres and temples:
 Bhadrachalam TempleIn Bhadradri Kothagudem district
 Ramappa TempleNear to Warangal City
 YadagiriguttaYadadri Bhuvanagiri district
 Thousand Pillar TempleHanamakonda city in Warangal District
 Kuchadri sri venkateshwara swamy temple in Kuchanpally, Medak District

Attractions:
 CharminarCentre of the Hyderabad Old City
 Golkonda FortLargest and 400 years oldest fort
 Chowmahalla PalaceIt was the official residence of the Nizams of Hyderabad.
 Ramoji Film CityLargest Film City in the world situated in Hyderabad City
 Warangal FortOldest fort built by Kakatiya before 13th century reflects the culture of Telugu people
 Thousand Pillar Temple - Built by King Rudra Deva in 1163 AD. The Thousand Pillar Temple is a specimen of the Kakatiyan style of architecture of the 12th century.
 Surendrapuri – A unique Mythological Awareness Centre near Yadagirigutta, 60 km from Hyderabad
 Salar Jung MuseumIt is one of the three National Museums of India, situated in Hyderabad City.
Golkonda (Telugu: గోల్కొండ, Urdu: گولکوندا), a ruined city of south-central India and capital of the medieval kingdom of Golkonda (c. 1364 – 1512), is situated 11 km west of Hyderabad.

Tripura

 Ujjayanta PalaceThe gleaming white Ujjayanta Palace located in the capital city of Agartala evokes the age of Tripura Maharajas. It is a unique experience to witness living history and royal splendour within the boundaries of the Palace. Constructed by the king of Tripura Maharja Radha Kishor Manikya during the late 19th century and finished off in 1901. The Indo-Saracenic building is set up in large Mughal-style garden with two man-made lakes on its both sides. The palace is of two-storied mansion and has three domes, each 86 feet high, stunning tile floor, curved wooden ceiling and wonderful crafted door. Floodlights and light and sound fountain has been set up in the palace.
 Unakotimeans one less than a crore. Located about 186 km from Agartala, Unokoti is an important site of archaeological wonder. It is a Shaiva pilgrimage attraction and dates back to the 7th to 9th centuries AD. The site consists of several huge vertical rock-cut carvings on a hillside. The site shows strong evidence of Buddhist occupation but also has a central Shiva head and imposing Ganesha figures having a height of 30 feet. The rocky walls also have a carved images of Hindu pantheon like Durga and Vishnu. The unakoti rock-cut carving have the distinction of being the largest bas-relief sculpture in India.
 Bhubaneshwari TempleAnother temple of eminence of Tripura is this temple. located 55 km from Agartala on the eastern fringe of Udaipur town by the bank of bank of river Gomati. The temple is now under the control of the Archaeological Survey of India. It was built by Maharaja Govinda Manikya (1660–1676). The temple is immortalised in Rabindranath Tagore's famous play known as Bisarjan and Rajarshi. Maharaja Govinda also features an important character in Tagore's play. While approaching Bhubaneshwari Temple one can find the ruins of the palace of the Maharaja. Down below the temple the river Gomati flows.
 Gunabati Group of TemplesFrom its name it reveals that it was built in the name of Maharani Gunabati (wife of Maharaja Govinda Manikya), in 1668 AD. The two other tempel also bears contemporary look but there actual history is still unveiled. Architecture of these temples resembles other contemporary temples of Tripura except the top most parts are without Stupa. Core-Chambers are marked by a presence of pitcher circular core chamber and its vestibule which was large with Stupa like crown is crafted like a lotus
 ChabimuraA famous panel of rock carving on the steep mountain walls on the banks of Gomati. There are huge images carved of Shiva, Vishnu, Kartika, Mahisasurmardini Durga and other Gods and goddesses. These images date back to the 15th or 16th century. Chabimura is 30 km away from Udaipur. It is situated in Amarpur subdivision. Devatamura means God's peak and it a full range between Udaipur and Amarpur Subdivision. It is famous for its many idols of gods and goddess. These images are carved on the rocky faces of Devtamura which is steep at 90 degrees. The hill ranges are covered with thick jungles and one cab reach this adobe of gods only after trekking through these jungles.
 BoxanagarRecently after denudation of a nature forest area, ruins of a brick built building emerged in the northwestern part of Sonamura Sub-Division on the edge of the border with Bangalasesh. The local people initially attribute the remains to the ancient temple of Manasa- the goddess of snake. Attention was drawn to the Archaeological Survey of India and they took over the site. There an idol of Lord Buddha was discovered and it was confirmed that once upon a time it was a Buddhist Temple i.e. a Monastery. More than excavation of the site will unearth the hidden story.
 Pilak, Tripura a famous place of attraction for its archaeological remains from the 8th and 9th centuries. Pilak is situated at a distance of 144 km from Agartala. The place is a treasure house of Buddhist and Sculpture in the Hindu Sculptures. There runs a hilly rivulet near the place which is known as Pilak stream. Few temples with plaques of terracotta and stone images can be found here. Huge sculptures made of stones of Avalokiteśvara in the 9th century and Narasimha image of the 12th century were found here. Both of there are now preserved in the Museum of Agartala. Even now one can find many sculptures of Goddess in Pilak as Lord Durga, Lord Ganesha, Lord Suriya, etc. There is image of a God holding a lotus which is of ten feet high. There are terracotta images of Kinnars. Two bronze statue of Buddhas were discovered in Rishyamukh near Pilak. All these lead to establish that the place was once under the rule of Buddhist kings followed by Hindu rulein subsequent years. Pilak, the treasure-trove of archaeological riches has close association with Mynamoti and Paharpur in Bangladesh. It is believed that the area has more hidden treasures and as such recently further excavation drive has been taken up by Archaeological Survey of India. Tourist may find it delighted to explore the history of this lovely destination.

Uttarakhand

Uttarakhand, the 27th state of the Republic of India, is called "the abode of the Gods" or referred as the "Heaven on Earth". It contains glaciers, snow-clad mountains, valley of flowers, skiing slopes and dense forests, and many shrines and places of pilgrimage. Chota Char Dhams, the minor pilgrimage of the four most sacred and revered Hindu temples: Badrinath, Kedarnath, Gangotri and Yamunotri are nestled in the Himalayas, of which Badrinath is part of Char Dham, major pilgrimage of four highly sacred Hindu temples. Haridwar which means Gateway to God is the only place on the plains.

It holds the watershed for Gangetic river system spanning 300 km from Satluj in the west to Kali river in the east. Nanda Devi (25,640 ft) is the second highest peak in India after Kanchenjunga (28,160 ft). Dunagiri, Neelkanth, Chaukhamba, Panchachuli, Trisul are other peaks above 23,000 ft. It is considered the abode of Devtas, Yakashyas, Kinners, Fairies and Sages. It has some old hill-stations developed during British era like Mussoorie, Almora, Dwarahat, Ranikhet and Nainital.

Uttar Pradesh

Situated in the northern part of India, border with the capital of India New Delhi, Uttar Pradesh is one of the most popular tourist destination in India. Uttar Pradesh is important with its wealth of historical monuments and religious fervour. It is the home of Taj Mahal, and Hinduism's holiest city, Varanasi. The most populous state of the Indian Union also has a rich cultural heritage. Kathak one of the eight forms of Indian classical dance, originated from Uttar Pradesh. Uttar Pradesh is known as The Heartland of India. Cuisine of Uttar Pradesh like Awadhi cuisine, Mughlai cuisine, Kumauni cuisine are very famous in entire India and abroad.

Places of interest in include

 Varanasi-The origin of Hinduism and world's one of the oldest cities. Also known as City of temples it is Most popular holy place of lord Shiva devotees. Some of the finest Textiles are produced here.

 Agra – Home to three World Heritage Sites i.e. Taj Mahal, Agra Fort & Fatehpur Sikri. Agra boast of several others historical monuments and gardens. Tomb of I'timād-ud-Daulah, Tomb of Akbar the Great to name a few.

 Prayagraj or Prayag -Kumbh Mela-The place where Indian national river Ganges and Yamuna and Saraswati rivers meet. A mass Hindu pilgrimage in which Hindus gather at the Ganges river. Akbar forts. One of the most popular religious centres of ancient and modern India for Hinduism. Uttar Pradesh's administrative and education capital.
 Bithoor-This is the historical capital of Uttar Pradesh from where the Hindu god Brahma created the universe. It is situated about 10 km from Kanpur.

 Kanpur – Uttar Pradesh's important Industrial town and largest city of the state. It is the most cosmopolitan city of the state. Has several historical places like-Bithoor and Allen Forest Zoo. It is the second largest metropolitan city of North India with various Historical and British Architectural buildings. The Kanpur Memoria Church or All Souls Memorial Church of Gothic architecture was built by Walter Granville on memory of those who died in Siege of Cawnpore.
 Lucknow-The capital of Uttar Pradesh. Most planned city of Uttar Pradesh. It has Several historical places Mughal, British and modern architecture. The cuisine and chikan dresses of Lucknow is famous worldwide.
 Mathura-The birthplace of Lord Krishna of Hinduism and Neminath of Jainism and Holy City
 Ayodhya-The birthplace of Lord Rama of Hinduism
 Jhansi-Historical place. City was centre of Rani Lakshmibai's battlefield against British
 Sarnath-Gautama Buddha first taught the Dharma, the Buddha as one of the four places of pilgrimage which his devout followers should visit. The birthplace of Shreyansanath, the eleventh Jain Tirthankar of the Jainism.
 Kushinagar- It is an important Buddhist pilgrimage site, where Gautama Buddha is believed to have attained Parinirvana after his death
 Chunar-It's the centre of clay art. Chunar has a 6th-century fort constructed by Chandragupta Vikramaditya. The fort itself had through rulers like Humayun, Sher Shah Suri and was gateway of Mauryan empire. It has waterfalls and natural spots.
 Fatehpur Sikri-Historical place for Mughal Empire's palaces and forts
 Meerut-The historical place of the Sepoy Mutiny of 1857 or the First War of Indian Independence. Indian Historical place from Mahabharata period of ancient India to Modern India's one of the fastest growing city of Uttar Pradesh.
Hastinapur : This is a popular religious site since it is believed to be capital of the Kauravas and birthplace of 3 tirthankar Shantinatha, Kunthunath and Aranatha.

Deogarh :  This places is famous for Deogarh fort and it's Gupta era Hindu and Jain temples dating back to 8th-9th century. like Dashavatara Temple and Shantinath temple.
 Mirzapur Division-The hub of world's finest carpet Industries, and very popular tourist destination for its natural beauties and one of the fastest growing region of Uttar Pradesh. It consists of vindhyachal shaktipeeth.
 Ghaziabad: Historical places from ancient India to modern India and India's fastest growing Industrial city. See Buddh International Circuit
 Noida and Greater Noida: IT, electronics and education hub of Northern India. India's biggest city with a planned and high-tech residential area.
 Gorakhpur: The city was home to Buddhist, Hindu, Muslim, Jain and Sikh saints. The birthplace of Paramhansa Yogananda, great Hindu emperor Chandragupta Maurya.
 Jaunpur:Historical city was founded by the Sultan of Delhi Feroz Shah Tughlaq and named in memory of his father, Muhammad bin Tughluq as Jaunpur Sultanate. Mughals, Lodis and Islamic ruler's Forts and ancient history of India.
 Dudhwa National Park – Dudhwa Tiger Reserve, Birds Sanctuary, Frog Temple at Oyal, Surat Bhawan Palace, elephant rides
 Rehar:Several major tourist attractions can be mentioned in the town's surroundings, like Jim Corbett National Park about 24 km, Nainital about 69 km.
 Vrindavan:A Town in Mathura district About 10 km from Mathura Famous for Prem Mandir Vrindavan, Banke Bihari Temple And world tallest temple going to be constructed Vrindavan Chandrodaya Mandir Uttar pradesh is a biggest political state in India. India is also known as the name of a gold bird.
 Ahichchhatra: is place where Parshvanatha attained Kevala Jnana. A number of Jain temples are built in area to commemorate Parshvanatha attaining Kēvalajñāna kalyāṇaka.

West Bengal

Kolkata (formerly Calcutta), is the capital of West Bengal has been nicknamed the City of Palaces, City of Joy, etc. This comes from the numerous palatial mansions built all over the city. Unlike many north Indian cities, whose construction stresses minimalism, the layout of much of the|right| architectural variety in Kolkata owes its origins to European styles and tastes imported by the British as it was the capital of British India from 1772 to 1911 and, to a much lesser extent, the Portuguese and French.
The buildings were designed and inspired by the tastes of the English gentleman around and the aspiring Bengali Babu (literally, a nouveau riche Bengali who aspired to cultivation of English etiquette, manners and custom, as such practices were favourable to monetary gains from the British). Today, many of these structures are in various stages of decay. Some of the major buildings of this period are well maintained and several buildings have been declared as heritage structures.
Long known as the "Cultural Capital of India" for its vibrant culture which has led India from the forefront from the 18th century onwards in all fronts ranging from culture to arts, literature to sciences, sports to politics, theatre to films. Home to the famous Bengal Renaissance which boasts of a host of luminaries like Raja Rammohan Roy, Ishwar Chandra Vidyasagar, Ramakrishna, Netaji Subhas Chandra Bose, Bankim Chandra Chattopadhyay, Acharya Jagadish Chandra Bose, Rabindranath Tagore, Swami Vivekananda, Khudiram, Chittaranjan Das, Sri Aurobindo, Sarat Chandra Chattopadhyay, Bagha Jatin, Bidhan Chandra Roy, and countless others. West Bengal is also known for the famous The Sunderbans.

From historical point of view, the story of West Bengal begins from Gour and Pandua situated close to the present district town of Malda. The twin medieval cities had been sacked at least once by changing powers in the 15th century. However, ruins from the period still remain, and several architectural specimens still retain the glory and shin of those times.
The Hindu architecture of Bishnupurin terracotta and laterite sandstone are renowned world over. Towards the British colonial period came the architecture of Murshidabad and Coochbehar.
Darjeeling is a famous Himalayan city in the state of West Bengal. Darjeeling tea is world-famous because of its attractive smell. Other than Darjeeling there are notable hill stations like Kalimpong, Lava, Lolegaon, Rishyap, etc. There are some wonderful trek routes also, like Sandakfu, Falut, etc. Beside hill stations West Bengal has some beaches like Digha, Shankarpur, Mandarmoni, Bakkhali etc.
West Bengal is home to six national parks — Sundarbans National Park, Buxa Tiger Reserve, Gorumara National Park, Neora Valley National Park, Jaldapara National Park, and Singalila National Park. Extant wildlife include Indian rhinoceroses, Indian elephants, deer, bison, leopards, gaur, and crocodiles, as well as many bird species. Migratory birds come to the state during the winter. The high-altitude forests of Singalila National Park shelter barking deer, red panda, chinkara, takin, serow, pangolin, minivet and kalij pheasants. Additionally, the Sundarbans are noted for a reserve project conserving the endangered royal Bengal tiger, although the forest hosts many other endangered species, such as the Gangetic dolphin, river terrapin and estuarine crocodile.

References

External links
 
 Ministry of Tourism, Govt of India
 Official India Tourism website

Tourism in India by state or union territory